Basketball coaching is the act of directing and strategizing the behavior of a basketball team or individual basketball player. Basketball coaching typically encompasses the improvement of individual and team offensive and defensive skills, as well as overall physical conditioning. Coaches also have the responsibility to improve their team by player development, strategy, and in-game management. Coaches also teach and inspire their team to be their best.

Coaching is usually performed by a single person, often with the help of one or more assistants.

Coaching tools 
A dry erase clipboard or tablet computer with a basketball court outline is often used mid-game to describe plays and provide an overview of the strategy of the opposing team. Coaches strategize and scout opposing teams and find ways to defeat them as easily as possible. At the same time, they overlook their own personal team to start the best five players (only five players can be on floor at one time). Coaches, also, have to be aware of substitutes to put in throughout the game so they can be fresh.

A drill designer is used to sketch drills, plays and information. Coaches also utilise file managers to store all coaching materials in one place and access from anywhere. Planners are also used to blueprint strategies and game plans.

College basketball coach John Wooden would spend two hours each morning with assistants planning out a day's practice minute-by-minute on three-by-five cards.  He kept each card year over year to adjust and improve.  He would train his players with "mental and emotional" conditioning by always making practice more intense than the game. Players would run faster than what a game would require so that they could be prepared to dominate in the game.

Coaching awards
 NBA Coach of the Year Award
 EuroLeague Coach of the Year Award
 ABA Coach of the Year Award (defunct)

See also
Head coach
Coach (sport)

References

 
Basketball personnel
Basketball